Miss Universe is an annual international beauty pageant that is run by a United States and Thailand based Miss Universe Organization.  It is one of the most watched pageants in the world with an estimated audience of over 500 million viewers in over 190 territories.  Along with Miss World, Miss International, and Miss Earth, Miss Universe is one of the Big Four international beauty pageants.

The Miss Universe Organization is currently owned by JKN Global Group. Telemundo has the licensing rights to air the pageant through 2023. The pageant's advocacy is "humanitarian issues and is a voice to affect positive change in the world."

The current Miss Universe is R'Bonney Gabriel of the United States who was crowned on January 14, 2023, in New Orleans, United States.

History

The title "Miss Universe" was first used by the International Pageant of Pulchritude in 1926. This contest was held annually until 1935, when the Great Depression and other events preceding World War II led to its demise.

The current Miss Universe pageant was founded in 1952 by Pacific Knitting Mills, a California-based clothing company and manufacturer of Catalina Swimwear, and has since been headquartered in the United States. The company was the sponsor of the Miss America pageant until 1951, when the winner, Yolande Betbeze, refused to pose for publicity pictures wearing one of their swimsuits. In 1952, Pacific Knitting Mills organized the Miss USA and Miss Universe pageants, co-sponsoring them for decades to follow.

The first Miss Universe Pageant was held in Long Beach, California in 1952. It was won by Armi Kuusela from Finland, who gave up her title, though not officially, to get married shortly before her year was completed. Until 1958, the Miss Universe title, like that of Miss America, was dated by the year following the contest, so at the time Ms. Kuusela's title was Miss Universe 1953. Since its founding by Pacific Mills, the pageant has been organized and conducted by the Miss Universe Organization. Eventually, Pacific Mills and its subsidiaries were acquired by the Kayser-Roth Corporation, which was in turn acquired by Gulf and Western Industries.

The pageant was first televised in 1955. CBS began broadcasting the combined Miss USA and Miss Universe pageants in 1960, and as separate contests in 1965. More than 30 years later, Donald Trump bought the pageant in 1996 from ITT Corp, with a broadcasting arrangement with CBS until 2002. During this time, in 1998, Miss Universe, Inc. changed its name to the Miss Universe Organization, and moved its headquarters from Los Angeles to New York City. By late 2002, Trump entered into a joint venture with NBC, which in 2003 outbid the other markets for the TV rights. From 2003 to 2014, the pageant was broadcast in the United States on NBC.

In June 2015, NBC cancelled all business relationships with Trump and the Miss Universe Organization in response to controversial statements about illegal immigrants who crossed the border from Mexico. As part of the legal settlement, in September 2015, Trump bought out NBC's 50% stake in the company, making him the company's sole owner. Three days later, he sold the whole company to WME/IMG. Following the change of ownership, in October 2015, Fox and Azteca became the official broadcasters of the Miss Universe and Miss USA pageants.

During the CBS telecast era, John Charles Daly hosted the Miss Universe Pageant from 1955 to 1966, Bob Barker from 1967 to 1987, Alan Thicke in 1988, John Forsythe in 1989, Dick Clark from 1990 to 1993, Bob Goen from 1994 to 1996, and Jack Wagner in 1998 and 1999. During the NBC telecast era, multiple hosts shared the duties—Billy Bush hosted the Miss Universe Pageant from 2003 to 2005 and 2009, Mario Lopez in 2007, Andy Cohen in 2011 and 2012, and Thomas Roberts in 2013 and 2014. Prior to 2022, Daisy Fuentes, Nancy O'Dell, Mel B and Natalie Morales were the only other females to have hosted the event multiple times (from 2002 to 2004, 2005 and 2006, 2008 and 2013, and from 2010 to 2011 and 2014, respectively).

Between 2015 and 2019, Miss Universe is televised live by Fox and hosted annually by Steve Harvey. The backstage correspondents include Roselyn Sanchez in 2015, Ashley Graham from 2016 to 2018, and Olivia Culpo in 2019. In 2020, the Miss USA and Miss Teen USA brands were split from the Miss Universe Organization into their independent organization, run by Crystle Stewart, while the broadcast rights to the Miss Universe Pageant was temporarily split between Telemundo and FYI. Lopez and Culpo then teamed up for co-hosting duties for the 2020 pageant after Harvey temporarily withdrew from the competition amidst COVID-19 pandemic restrictions at the time. The contract with Fox and Harvey was resumed for the 2021 edition, with Cheslie Kryst as the main correspondent.

On October 26, 2022, Thailand-based JKN Global Group acquired Miss Universe Organization (MUO) from Endeavor Group Holdings-owned IMG Worldwide at $14 million, making Anne Jakapong Jakrajutatip the first transgender woman to own the organization and marking the first time the organization expands its headquarters outside the U.S. From the 2022 edition onwards, NBC has re-acquired broadcast rights via The Roku Channel for the competition as a result of the ownership changes, marking the first time in Miss Universe history that the pageant has transitioned from traditional broadcast network coverage to full streaming service in the United States. 2022 marked the first time in the pageant's history that an all-female panel hosted the event, in Jeannie Mai and Olivia Culpo.

Contestant selection

To gain participation in Miss Universe, a country needs a local company or person to buy the local rights of the competition through a franchise fee. The fee includes the rights of image, brand and everything related to the pageant. Often the owner of the franchise returns the franchise to the Miss Universe Organization, which resells it to a new stakeholder. The reselling of the franchise from one owner to the next is recurrently common in the history of the event, sometimes for contractual breaches or financial reasons. The number of participants fluctuates annually because of the franchising of the pageant paired with conflicting schedules to the regular calendar, but has steadied above 70 countries since 1989.

Usually a country's candidate selection involves pageants in the nation's local subdivisions, where local winners compete in a national pageant, but there are some countries who opt for an internal selection. For example, from 2000 to 2004, Australian delegates were chosen by a modeling agency. Although such "castings" are generally discouraged by the Miss Universe Organization, Jennifer Hawkins was chosen to represent the country in Miss Universe in 2004 (where she would eventually win the crown). Australia would eventually reinstate its national pageant for Miss Universe from 2005 onwards.

Recent countries that debuted in the pageant include Cameroon (2020), Bahrain (2021) and Bhutan (2022). Laos is the latest newcomer and the most recent country to obtain its first ever semifinal placement at Miss Universe, after debuting in 2017 and entering the Top 16 in 2022. Meanwhile, Botswana remains the most recent first-time entry to ever win Miss Universe on its debut year (in Mpule Kwelagobe in 1999), and Angola is the most recent country to obtain its first ever national win in Miss Universe (in Leila Lopes in 2011).

Cultural barriers, particularly with the swimsuit competition, have prevented some countries from participating, while others like Mozambique have not participated because of the prohibitive cost of the event. The Miss Universe has historically proven popular in regions like the Americas, Africa and Asia, especially in countries like United States, Philippines, Colombia, Brazil, Venezuela, South Africa, Thailand and Indonesia, given their successful track record of multiple semifinal appearances in the last decade and combined multiple titles in the competition's history. Two countries have been present at all but one: United States (1957) and Germany (2020).

Since its inception, contestants have also been forbidden to be married or pregnant during the competition, and, in the case of winners, during their reign. Beginning in 2023, however, the Miss Universe Organization will allow married or pregnant women to compete in the pageant. Accepting married contestants reinvigorates tension between the American-based Miss Universe pageant and the European-based Mrs. Universe pageant, which was previously the only avenue for married women to compete for the Universe title. However, distinction between the two pageants still exists based on upper age limits, where Mrs. Universe allows contestants up to 55 years of age, while Miss Universe remains restricted to women under 28 even if they are married.

Miss Universe has always strictly prohibited age fabrication. While the pageant's minimum age limit has been set at 18 years old, this presents a problem for several European countries that allow 17-year-old contestants to compete in their pageants.  National titleholders under 18 years of age must be replaced by their runner-up or another candidate in the main pageant. In recent years, all Miss Universe candidates have been required to be at least university degree holders or working professionals from the onset of their national pageants.

Since 2012, openly transgender women have been allowed to compete as long as they won their national pageants. Six years after this rule went into effect, Angela Ponce of Spain became the first openly transgender candidate to compete in the contest, in the 2018 edition. In 2019, Myanmar's Swe Zin Htet became the first openly lesbian woman to compete in Miss Universe. Spain's Patricia Yurena Rodríguez is currently the highest-placed LGBT member at Miss Universe, placing second to Venezuela's Gabriela Isler in 2013, but did not come out until years after the competition. In 2021, the Philippines' Beatrice Gomez became the first openly bisexual (and LGBT) contestant to enter the Miss Universe semifinals, after finishing in the Top 5 that year.

Main pageant

Throughout the history of Miss Universe, the main pageant has varied widely in terms of annual scheduling. In the last decade, the Miss Universe competition has been consistently held over a two-week period between early November and late January. Because of television schedule demands (largely as a result of international timezone differences) or conflicting national events happening during the organizing process (such as the ongoing COVID-19 pandemic, the Olympics, FIFA World Cup and national elections depending on the hosting country), four  editions have been postponed to next year (as with the 2014, 2016, 2020, and 2022 editions). The most recent edition held during the regular calendar year was in 2022, held in New Orleans , United States on 14 January 2023. The next edition 2023 pageant is scheduled for December  2023 in El Salvador. Between the early 1970s through the late 2000s, the pageant spans a full month (typically between March and June) to allow time for rehearsals, appearances, and the preliminary competition, with the winner being crowned by the previous year's titleholder during the final competition.

According to the organizers, the Miss Universe contest is more than a beauty pageant, though they are expected to participate in swimsuit and evening gown competitions. Women aspiring to become Miss Universe must be intelligent, well-mannered, and cultured. If a candidate is unable to perform well during each round, she is often eliminated. Normally, the placements of the candidates are determined by a ranked vote, where each judge ranks each of the candidates individually and within the stipulated rules. Commencing at the first pageant until 2016, the pageant semifinalists were chosen on a round robin system. Between 2017 and 2019, the semifinalists were selected based on highest scores per continental group followed by the judging panel's wildcard list along an extra candidate chosen in popular choice. In the past, all preliminary results were reset and a new competition starts with the highest placed positions at the semifinals. From 2020 onwards, the round robin system was reinstated where in each round of the grand final, the group of candidates with the lowest rates are progressively eliminated. However, this criterion has been modified to use weighted averages or with points accumulated by stages from the preliminary competition to coronation night, with the assessment in ascending or descending order. Since the pageant's inception, all semifinalists are announced at the beginning of the live telecast regardless of the edition's format and if ties occur in the final rounds, the preliminary results are used.

The winner then signs a contract with the Miss Universe Organization that can last from seven to eighteen months (the period of its duration is variable, as it follows the demands of the Miss Universe Organization). The new Miss Universe takes office immediately after the coronation and takes on a public cause in which she becomes the ambassador for a year to spread messages about the control of diseases, peace, and public awareness of AIDS (though the organization's more recent humanitarian works have included various causes such as women's and ethnic minority rights, along with contemporary racial issues, public health issues and the consequences of global warming). Aside from the job, the winner also receives a cash allowance for her entire reign, a New York Film Academy scholarship, a modeling portfolio, beauty products, clothes, shoes, as well as styling, healthcare, and fitness services by different sponsors of the pageant. She also gains exclusive access to events such as fashion shows and opening galas, as well as access to casting calls and modeling opportunities throughout New York City. Between 1996 and 2015, the winner is given the use of a Trump Place apartment in New York City during her reign, which she shares with the Miss USA and Miss Teen USA titleholders. Starting in 2022, the winner and the two runners-up in the Top 3 will shuffle between residences in New York, United States and Bangkok, Thailand.

If the winner, for any reason, cannot fulfill her duties as Miss Universe, the first runner-up takes over. Aside from the main winner and her runners-up, special awards are also given to the winners of the Best National Costume, Miss Photogenic, and Miss Congeniality. The Miss Congeniality award is chosen by the delegates themselves. In recent years, Miss Photogenic has been chosen by popular internet vote (the winner used to be chosen by media personnel covering the event), and the winning country for Best National Costume is announced live after the naming of the semifinalists during the coronation night.

Crowns of Miss Universe
The crown of Miss Universe has changed nine times over the course of its 70-year history. 
 Romanov Imperial Nuptial Crown (1952) as the first crown, was previously owned by the now-defunct Russian monarchy. It was used by Armi Kuusela in 1952.
 Romanov Diadem Crown or Metal Bronze Crown  (1953) —  When Christiane Martel became Miss Universe 1953, the nuptial crown was replaced by a metallic bronze crown. She was the only Miss Universe titleholder to wear this crown. 
 Star of the Universe (1954–1960) — This crown was used from 1954 to 1960. It was named as such due to the star shape at the top of the crown. It is made up of approximately 1,000 Oriental cultured and black pearls set in solid gold and platinum and only weighed 1.25 pounds. It was insured for US$500,000.
  Lady Rhinestone Crown or Coventry Crown (1961–2001) — This crown was purely made from rhinestones, debuting in 1961 as part of the 10th anniversary of the Miss Universe pageant. Only Marlene Schmidt and Norma Nolan wore this crown. In 1963, renowned jeweler Sarah Coventry reinvented the rhinestone crown which featured a female figure (holding a scepter) as its main centerpiece. The cheaper cost of its rhinestone design made it possible to create exact replicas of the crown to be given to outgoing titleholders. The design was slightly modified in 1973 for the wearer's convenience, and was dubbed as The Lady Crown. This was used until 2002, when Denise Quinones became its last crown holder before relinquishing her role as Miss Universe, and the Mikimoto Pearl company accepted the offer to sponsor a commemorative crown for the Miss Universe Organization during the same year's 50th overall edition for the pageant.
 Mikimoto Crown (2002–2007; 2017–2018) — used from 2002 to 2007 for the 50th commemorative anniversary of the Miss Universe organization, this crown was designed by Tomohiro Yamaji for the Mikimoto Company, the official jewel sponsor of the Miss Universe Organization. The crown depicted the phoenix rising, signifying status, power and beauty, as stipulated in their sponsorship deal. The crown has 500 natural colorless diamonds of almost , 120 South Sea and Akoya pearls, ranging in size from 3 to 18 mm diameter and is valued at US$250,000. The crown was designed for the pageant on Mikimoto Pearl Island in Japan with the Mikimoto crown and tiara being first used for Miss Universe 2002, which was unveiled by former proprietor Donald Trump. Among pageant connoisseurs, the Mikimoto crown is reputedly the most sought among beauty titleholders, before finally being retired for use after Catriona Gray became the last Miss Universe winner to ever use the crown on her reign until 2019.
 CAO Crown (2008) —  In 2008, Dayana Mendoza was crowned with a tiara designed by a tandem of Rosalina Lydster and Dang Kim Lien of CAO Fine Jewelry. The crown was valued at US$120,000, was made of an 18 karat combination of white and yellow gold and composed of over 1,000 precious stones, including 555 white diamonds (30 carats), 375 cognac diamonds (14 carats), 10 smoky quartz crystals (20 carats) and 19 morganite gemstones (60 carats). The yellow lustre of the gold represents the prosperous thriving economy in Vietnam as symbolized by a Vietnamese Crane heron. However, Mendoza declined to use this crown and thus insisted on the Mikimoto crown when she crowned her compatriot, Stefanía Fernández as her successor.
  Diamond Nexus Crown (2009–2013) —  From 2009 to 2013, Diamond Nexus Labs made the Miss Universe crown. It contains 544.31 grams of 14k and 18k white gold as well as platinum. The crown features synthetic rubies to represent Miss Universe's HIV/AIDS education and awareness platform. Diamond Nexus Labs is the first ever eco-friendly Official Jeweler of Miss Universe and was selected as part of NBC Universal's "Green is Universal"  initiative.
 DIC Crown (2014–2016) —  From 2014 to 2016, Paulina Vega, Pia Wurtzbach and Iris Mittenaere were decorated with the DIC Crown, estimated to be worth US$300,000 and produced by Czech company Diamonds International Corporation (DIC). The whole production process took approximately four months and required the work of ten artisans. The crown is reminiscent of the Manhattan Skyline and is composed of 311 diamonds, 5 pieces of blue topaz, 198 pieces of blue sapphire, 33 pieces of heat—fired crystals, and 220 grams of 18k karat white gold. The grand total weight of the crown is 411 grams. This crown was retired in 2017 due to a copyright infringement and subsequent payment issues between DIC and the Miss Universe Organization.
 Mouawad Power of Unity Crown (2019–2021) — On December 5, 2019, Mouawad Jewelry became the new jeweler for the Miss Universe Organization. With an estimated average worth of almost US$6 million, the Mouawad crowns are the world's most expensive set of pageant crowns on record. From 2019 to 2021, Zozibini Tunzi, Andrea Meza and Harnaaz Sandhu were decorated with the first-generation Mouawad Crown, revealed the Mouawad Power of Unity Crown. The crown consists of Golden Canary Diamond that weighs 62.83 carat. According to Pascal Mouawad, the crown symbolizes Ambition, Diversity, Community, and Beauty. 

 Mouawad Force for Good Crown (2022–present) — In 2022, with the ownership of the Miss Universe Organization transferred to Jakkaphong Jakrajutatip, the contract with Mouawad Jewelry was renewed and a new Mouawad crown design was unveiled. The second-generation Mouawad crown is named  Force for Good and was introduced on December 19, 2022. The crown holds 110 carats of blue sapphires, 48 carats of white diamonds, and a 45.14-carat royal blue sapphire at its center.

Gallery of Miss Universe crowns

Recent titleholders

Gallery of winners 
† = deceased

Miss Universe Organization
The Miss Universe Organization is the organization that currently owns and runs the Miss Universe beauty pageant competition. Between 2020 and 2022, it ceased to organize the Miss USA and the Miss Teen USA competitions, when these franchises were in the hands of Crystle Stewart.

Based in New York City and Bangkok, the organization is currently owned by the Thai holding and conglomerate JKN Global Group since 20 October 2022, when the former owners WME/IMG sold the pageant. The current president is Paula Shugart. The organization sells television rights to the pageants and pageant organizations in other countries.

Miss Universe Organization titleholders

The following is a list of all Miss Universe Organization titleholders from the founding of each pageant until the separation of Miss USA and Miss Teen USA into a new organization between 2020 and 2022.

Notes

Gallery

In other media
Electronic Arts was reportedly developing a video game based on the pageant, but development status is currently uncertain due to the closure of EA Black Box, the studio allegedly developing the game.

See also
 List of beauty contests
 Mrs. Universe
 Big Four international beauty pageants

References

External links
 

 
International beauty pageants
Recurring events established in 1952
1952 establishments in California
Miss Universe Organization